Colonel Jeannette South-Paul (born 1953) is an American physician. She is the first African-American and first woman to be a permanent department chair at the University of Pittsburgh's School of Medicine.

Early life and education 
In 1975, South-Paul earned a bachelor's degree in medical technology from the University of Pennsylvania. She then attended the University of Pittsburgh for her medical education, graduating in 1979, then completed postgraduate medical education in family practice at Ft. Gordon, Georgia in 1982 and the University of North Carolina in 1984. She attended university on an Army scholarship, and served 22 years as a family physician in the United States Army.

Career and research 
South-Paul has dedicated her career to improving community health and rectifying healthcare disparities in America, especially those that affect people in poverty and people of color. In 1983, she became a professor at the Uniformed Services University of the Health Sciences (USUHS), where she taught family medicine and researched the benefits of exercise and maternal-child health along with her work on health disparities. In 2001, she became the first woman and first African-American person at the University of Pittsburgh to hold a permanent chair position, when she was appointed the Andrew W. Mathieson Professor Department Chair.

Honors and awards 
 Fellow, American Academy of Family Physicians
 Diplomate, American Board of Family Medicine
 Distinguished Service Medal, USUHS
 Exemplary Teaching Award, American Academy of Family Physicians
 Member, American Medical Association
 Member, National Medical Association
 Member, American Medical Women's Association

References

1953 births
Living people
American primary care physicians
20th-century American women physicians
20th-century American physicians
University of Pittsburgh faculty
University of Pennsylvania alumni
University of North Carolina alumni
African-American women physicians
American women academics
United States Army Medical Corps officers
Female United States Army officers
21st-century American women physicians
21st-century American physicians
African-American female military personnel
20th-century American military personnel
20th-century African-American women
20th-century African-American people
20th-century African-American physicians
21st-century African-American women
21st-century African-American physicians
African-American United States Army personnel